Jane Hughes may refer to: 
Jane Hughes (poet) (1811–1880), Welsh poet and hymnist who wrote under the pen name Deborah Maldwyn
Jane Hughes (swimmer) (born 1948), Canadian swimmer
Jane Brereton (1685–1740), née Hughes, Welsh poet who wrote in English
Jane Fawcett (1921–2016), née Hughes, British codebreaker, singer, and heritage preservationist